The diaulos was an ancient Greece wind instrument composed of two pipes (aulos), which were played similar to an oboe. the diaulos is basically yo flutes put tobether The two pipes were connected at their base and often of different lengths. Circular breathing was sometimes used by the performer.

See also
Mijwiz

References 

Ancient Greek musical instruments
Woodwind instruments